The eastern bluebird (Sialia sialis) is a small North American migratory thrush found in open woodlands, farmlands, and orchards.

The bright-blue breeding plumage of the male, easily observed on a wire or open perch, makes this species a favorite of birders.
It is the state bird of Missouri and New York.

Taxonomy

The eastern bluebird was formally described by the Swedish naturalist Carl Linnaeus in 1758 in the tenth edition of his Systema Naturae under the binomial name Motacilla sialis. The type location is South Carolina. Linnaeus based his short Latin description on the earlier more detailed descriptions by the English naturalists Mark Catesby and George Edwards. The eastern bluebird is now placed in the genus Sialia that was introduced by the English naturalist William John Swainson in 1827 with the eastern bluebird as the type species.

Seven subspecies are recognised:
 S. s. sialis (Linnaeus, 1758) – south, southeast Canada, east, central US and northeast Mexico
 S. s. bermudensis Verrill, AH, 1901 – Bermuda
 S. s. nidificans Phillips, AR, 1991 – east central Mexico
 S. s. fulva Brewster, 1885 – southwest US to central Mexico
 S. s. guatemalae Ridgway, 1882 – southeast Mexico and Guatemala
 S. s. meridionalis Dickey & Van Rossem, 1930 – El Salvador, Honduras and north Nicaragua
 S. s. caribaea Howell, TR, 1965 – east Honduras and northeast Nicaragua

Description

Male bluebirds have a bright head, back, and wings. Their breast is a brownish red. Females are lighter with gray on the head and back and some blue on their wings and tail. In females, the breast is usually lighter in color than in males, and is more orange.

Distribution and habitat
The eastern bluebird is found east of the Rockies, southern Canada to the Gulf states, and southeastern Arizona to Nicaragua. The increase in trees throughout the Great Plains during the past century due to fire suppression and tree planting facilitated the western range expansion of the species. as well as range expansions of many other species of birds. From 1966-2015 the eastern bluebird experienced a greater than 1.5% annual population increase throughout most of its breeding and year-round ranges, with exceptions including southern Florida and the Ohio River valley.

Bluebirds tend to live in open country around trees, but with little understory and sparse ground cover. Original habitats probably included open, frequently burned pine savannas, beaver ponds, mature but open woods, and forest openings. Today, they are most common along pastures, agricultural fields, suburban parks, backyards, and even golf courses. Populations also occur across eastern North America and south as far as Nicaragua. Birds that live farther north and in the west of the range tend to lay more eggs than eastern and southern birds.

An isolated, insular subspecies of the eastern bluebird is found on Bermuda, and has a distinctive, brighter blue coloration compared to mainland populations. This population was formerly thought to have been predated the colonization of the islands (making it one of only three extant, resident pre-colonization Bermuda landbirds, alongside the Bermuda white-eyed vireo and gray catbird). However, analysis of fossil strata found no evidence for the existence of bluebirds on the islands prior to European colonization. Using simulations and molecular evidence, a 2013 study found that the Bermuda bluebirds likely descend from very small founder population from a single colonization event during the 1600s. This colonization event could either be a natural one by migratory individuals or an anthropogenic introduction by early settlers, who are known to have introduced several other eastern North American birds like the northern cardinal (Cardinalis cardinalis) to Bermuda very shortly after colonization. It is likely that the alteration to the islands' ecosystem due to the clearing of native forest facilitated this colonization by providing optimal bluebird feeding habitat, along with a lack of predators.

Behavior and ecology
Eastern bluebirds are social, and will sometimes gather in flocks of over a hundred. However, they are territorial during the breeding season and may continue to defend a feeding area throughout the winter.

Breeding

Mating occurs in the spring and summer. A mature female typically raises two broods each season. Nests are constructed in trees within abandoned woodpecker holes or other cavities that provide adequate protection (usually several feet above ground). Construction of the nest is done primarily by the female and takes around 10 days to complete. These nests are small, cup-like structures lined with grass, feathers, stems, and hairs. Each female lays three to seven light-blue or, rarely, white eggs. The female incubates the eggs, which hatch after 13 to 16 days. The young cannot care for themselves upon hatching. The female broods the chicks for up to seven days after hatching. Fledglings then leave the nest 15 to 20 days after hatching.

Both parents cooperate in raising the young, which they feed a diet consisting almost entirely of insects. Some young stay around the nest to help raise another brood. Fledglings are grayish in color, with speckled breasts. The blue color becomes much more prominent and the speckles on their breasts disappear as they mature. Bluebirds may begin breeding the summer after they are hatched.

Eastern bluebirds can live for 6 to 10 years. The longest recorded lifespan for a bluebird is 10 years and five months. However, most bluebirds die within their first year of life. Starvation and freezing are a danger to the young, but most threats come from other animals, including humans. Natural predators of eggs and nestlings can include eastern chipmunks, flying squirrels, American black bears, fire ants, and raccoons. Bluebirds of all ages (including adults) are threatened by rat snakes, racers, American kestrels, and domestic cats. Introduced species such as European starlings and house sparrows are competitors for nesting sites. Non-nesting adults face predation by all native species of falcons, owls, and most varieties of hawks, particularly those in the genus Accipiter. When approached by a predator, the male makes a song-like warning cry. If no male is present, a threatened female will begin to sing, hoping to attract a protective male back to the territory. Both males and females also flick their wings and warble when predators are nearby.

Food and feeding
About two thirds of an adult bluebird's diet consists of insects and other invertebrates. The remainder is made up of wild fruits or berries. It has a preference for grasshoppers, crickets, katydids, and beetles; and will also eat earthworms, spiders, millipedes, centipedes, sowbugs, and snails.

Bluebirds feed by perching on a high point, such as a branch or fence post, and swooping down to catch insects on or near the ground. The availability of a winter food source will often determine whether or not a bird will migrate. If bluebirds do remain in a region for the winter, they group and seek cover in heavy thickets, orchards, or other areas in which adequate food and cover resources are available.

Conservation 
Eastern Bluebirds thrived in the 1700s and 1800s. This flourishing is thought to be connected with the activity of settlers. Clearing forests made new habitat available for bluebirds and nesting sites were created in the increasing numbers of apple orchards and in wooden fence posts that eventually rotted. It is believed that bluebirds were most abundant around 1900. However, increasing competition with the invasive species of European starlings (Sturnus vulgaris) and house sparrows (Passer domesticus) along with loss of farmland began to take a toll on bluebird populations. Along with these, pesticides and scarcity of food during winter compounded to cause the number of bluebirds to fall. A definite drop has been shown to have occurred between 1938 and the late 1970s.

Conservation efforts are seen as early as 1934 when Thomas Musselman created the first bluebird trail by setting up rows of bluebird houses along roads. Also in the 1930s, William Duncan created a bluebird house design and educated others about these birds. In 1964, The National Association for Protection and Propagation of the Purple Martin and Bluebirds of America was founded. After it went out of existence, the Nature Society kept up with conservation work. Lawrence Zeleny's 1976 book, The Bluebird: How You Can Help Its Fight For Survival, and a National Geographic article he wrote helped make the plight of these birds well known. In 1978, the North American Bluebird Society was founded.

If the Bermuda population of bluebirds is considered the product of natural colonization, it has also become highly endangered. Early settlers described individual flocks numbering over 50 birds each flying across the islands, but in the present only 500 individuals are thought to remain. The near-extinction of Bermuda cedar (Juniperus bermudiana) forest in the 1940s and 1950s wiped out the majority of natural nesting habitat for bluebirds, leaving it almost completely dependent on artificial nest boxes for breeding. Introduced starlings and house sparrows evict bluebirds from their nests, and introduced great kiskadees (Pitangus sulphuratus) feed on juvenile birds. They are also threatened by feral cats and pesticides.

In culture 
Bluebirds were popular with early American colonists and associated with the coming of spring. They were referred to as the 'blue robin' because of their resemblance to the European robin. Bluebirds have been mentioned in the works of many writers including Thoreau's writings, Robert Frost's "The Last Word of a Bluebird (as told to a child)", the "Over the Rainbow" song from The Wizard of Oz, the song "Zip-A-Dee-Doo-Dah" ("Mister Bluebird's on my shoulder") from Disney's Song of the South, and John Burrough's "The Bluebird". Lawrence Zeleny said that bluebirds represent joy to Americans.

See also
 Bluebird of happiness

References

External links

 North American Bluebird Society
 Life Histories of Familiar North American Birds: Eastern Bluebird
 
 Eastern Bluebird Overview, All About Birds – Cornell Lab of Ornithology
 Eastern Bluebird at Northern Prairie Wildlife Research Center
 Bermuda Department of Conservation Services Bluebird Page
 Sialis.org — Resources and advice for bluebird conservation.
 
 
 Eastern Bluebird - Sialia sialis - USGS Patuxent Bird Identification InfoCenter
 

eastern bluebird
Birds of Bermuda
Native birds of Eastern Canada
Native birds of the Eastern United States
Birds of Central America
eastern bluebird
eastern bluebird
Extant Late Pleistocene first appearances
Symbols of New York (state)
Symbols of Missouri